Siftr Magic is a photo-curation platform, which makes use of artificial intelligence and deep learning. The company was founded by Romil Mittal and Mayank Bhagya, who both are ex-Adobe employees.

SIFTR platform provides photo curation services intended to help users sort their own photos and make the best use of them. The first offering from the platform was self-updating photography websites.

History
SIFTR Labs was founded in 2015 by Romil Mittal and Mayank Bhagya, and the company released its first product in October 2015. The company, headquartered in New Delhi, is backed by angel investors. The site was inspired by the fact that people want to discover and make use of their photos.

See also
 Website builder

References

External links
 Official website

Internet properties established in 2015
Image-sharing websites
Indian photography websites